John Leerams Chicano (born October 6, 1991), popularly known as Rambo in the triathlon community,
is a professional Filipino triathlete. He won a gold medal at the 2019 Southeast Asian Games men's triathlon at Subic Bay Boardwalk in Zambales.

Career
Prior to becoming a triathlete, Chicano was a cyclist competing in junior competitions. In 2007, he had to work in a bicycle shop so he could earn a living to support his child. The owner of the shop was Coach Melvin Fausto, a coach for the Triathlon Association of the Philippines (TRAP). Fausto saw potential in Chicano and trained him to become a bicycle mechanic and later taught him on how to become a triathlete. Prior to training under Fausto, Chicano had no experience in how to swim and had to be taught in swimming for three months. Within a year, Chicano became competitive enough to be able to participate and win races at the Subic International Triathlon. He became a member of the national team in 2009.

Chicano competed at the Southeast Asian Games. He represented the Philippines in the 2017 edition in Kuala Lumpur along with Nikko Huelgas in triathlon. He settled for silver after he helped his compatriot, Huelgas in the cycling leg of the men's triathlon event who eventually won the gold medal. Chicano himself won gold in the 2019 edition hosted at home in the Philippines with the men's triathlon event held in Subic.

Personal life
Chicano was born on October 6, 1991 in Olongapo City, Zambales. He is a father of two children.

See also 

 Philippines at the 2019 Southeast Asian Games

References 

1991 births
Living people
Sportspeople from Zambales
Southeast Asian Games gold medalists for the Philippines
Southeast Asian Games competitors for the Philippines
Filipino male swimmers
Filipino male triathletes
Filipino sportspeople
Southeast Asian Games silver medalists for the Philippines
Triathletes at the 2014 Asian Games
Triathletes at the 2018 Asian Games
Competitors at the 2017 Southeast Asian Games
Competitors at the 2019 Southeast Asian Games
Southeast Asian Games medalists in triathlon
Asian Games competitors for the Philippines
Competitors at the 2021 Southeast Asian Games
21st-century Filipino people